Aksarsay River
 Amu Darya
 Angren River
 Chatkal River
 Chirchiq River
 Kara Darya
 Karatag River
 Naryn River
 Qashqadaryo River
 Sokh River
 Surxondaryo River
 Syr Darya
 Zeravshan River

See also
 Geography of Uzbekistan#Topography and drainage
 Great Fergana Canal

 
Uzbekistan
Rivers